Schüssel Moraine is a large morainal deposit occupying Schüssel Cirque in the north-central Humboldt Mountains of Queen Maud Land. It was discovered and first plotted by the German Antarctic Expedition, 1938–39, who named the cirque. The moraine was named in association with Schüssel Cirque by the Soviet expedition which obtained air photos of the feature in 1961.

References

Moraines of Queen Maud Land
Humboldt Mountains (Antarctica)